The Tamar Regional Council (Mo'atza Ezorit Tamar) is a regional council in Israel's Southern District, on the south and western edges of the Dead Sea along the Arava valley. The council was established in 1955 with the opening of lodging at Sodom near the Dead Sea Works, and its jurisdiction covers an area of 1,650 km2.

The first council head was Yehuda Almog (Kopelivitch), who had lived in the area from 1934. The present Mayor of the Tamar Regional Council is Mr. Dov Litvinoff.

The council today encompasses communal villages, agriculture, factories, tourist sites, and military and civilian installations. Tamar council has a permanent population of 2,300, half of which is Jewish and lives in five communities, and half of which is Arab living in unrecognized communities. Many people from other areas are employed both year-round and seasonally at the Dead Sea Works, the Dead Sea hotel district at Neve Zohar, and numerous other tourist spots like Ein Gedi and Masada. According to the Israel Central Bureau of Statistics (CBS), the total population of the regional council in 2006 was 2,300.

List of settlements
Ein Gedi kibbutz
Har Amasa (kibbutz)
Neot HaKikar (moshav)
Ein Hatzeva (moshav)
Ein Tamar (moshav)
Neve Zohar (community settlement)

References

External links
Jordanian / Israeli Cooperation at Southern Dead Sea MoU signed to advance sustainable development in the Southern Dead Sea Basin, article by Friends of the Earth Middle East (FoEME), published January 18, 2007

 
Regional councils in Israel
1955 establishments in Israel